This is a list of butterflies of the Solomon Islands archipelago.

Hesperiidae

Pyrginae
Tagiades japetus hovia (Swinhoe, 1904)
Tagiades japetus kazana  Evans, 1934
Tagiades japetus banika  Tennent, 2004
Tagiades japetus suumoli  Tennent, 2001
Tagiades trebellius vella (Evans, 1934)
Tagiades trebellius lola  Evans, 1949

Coeliadinae
Badamia exclamationis (Fabricius, 1775)
Allora doleschallii solon  Evans, 1949
Allora doleschallii luna (Evans, 1934)
Allora doleschallii cristobalensis  Tennent, 2001
Hasora chromus bilunata (Butler, 1883)
Hasora hurama kieta (Strand, 1921)
Hasora hurama diana  Evans, 1959
Hasora celaenus (Stoll, 1782)

Hesperiinae
Cephrenes augiades tugela  Evans, 1949
Cephrenes shortlandica (Swinhoe, 1915)
Telicota solva (Evans, 1949)
Suniana sunias isabella  Evans, 1934
Borbo impar tetragraphus (Mabille, 1891)
Borbo cinnara (Wallace & Moore, 1866)
Pelopidas agna agnata  Evans, 1937
Pelopidas lyelli lyelli (Rothschild, 1915)
Caltoris philippina subfenestrata (Röber, 1891)

Papilionidae

Papilioninae
Pachliopta polydorus polypemon (Mathew, 1887)
Pachliopta polydorus polydaemon (Mathew, 1887)
Ornithoptera priamus urvillianus (Guérin-Méneville, 1838)
Ornithoptera victoriae regis (Rothschild, 1895)
Ornithoptera victoriae rubianus (Rothschild, 1904)
Ornithoptera victoriae isabellae (Rothschild & Jordan, 1901)
Ornithoptera victoriae victoriae (Gray, 1856)
Ornithoptera victoriae reginae  Salvin, 1888
Ornithoptera victoriae epiphanes (Schmid, 1970)
Graphium agamemnon salomonis  Rothschild, 1895
Graphium agamemnon ugiensis (Jordan, 1909)
Graphium meeki meeki (Rothschild & Jordan, 1901)
Graphium mendana acous (Ribbe, 1898)
Graphium mendana neyra (Rothschild, 1895)
Graphium mendana mendana (Godman & Salvin, 1888)
Graphium mendana aureofasciatum  Racheli, 1979
Graphium hicetaon (Mathew, 1886)
Graphium codrus gabriellae  Racheli, 1979
Graphium codrus tenebrionis (Rothschild, 1895)
Graphium codrus pisidice (Godman & Salvin, 1888)
Graphium codrus christobalus (Jordan, 1909)
Graphium sarpedon isander (Godman & Salvin, 1888)
Graphium sarpedon impar (Rothschild, 1895)
Chilasa toboroi straatmani (Racheli, 1979)
Papilio aegeus oberon (Grose Smith, 1897)
Papilio woodfordi woodfordi  Godman & Salvin, 1888
Papilio woodfordi choiseuli  Rothschild, 1908
Papilio woodfordi ariel (Grose Smith, 1889)
Papilio woodfordi laarchus (Godman & Salvin, 1888)
Papilio woodfordi ptolychus (Godman & Salvin, 1888)
Papilio woodfordi mome  Tennent, 1999
Papilio woodfordi gimblei  Tennent, 1999
Papilio bridgei bridgei  Mathew, 1886
Papilio bridgei prospero (Grose Smith, 1889)
Papilio bridgei hecataeus (Godman & Salvin, 1888)
Papilio bridgei michae  Racheli, 1984
Papilio erskinei  Mathew, 1886
Papilio phestus minusculus (Ribbe, 1898)
Papilio fuscus hasterti (Ribbe, 1907)
Papilio fuscus relmae  Tennent, 1999
Papilio fuscus gyrei  Tennent, 1999
Papilio fuscus xenophilus (Mathew, 1886)
Papilio ulysses orsippus (Godman & Salvin, 1888)
Papilio ulysses georgius  Rothschild, 1908

Pieridae

Coliadinae
Catopsilia pomona (Fabricius, 1775)
Catopsilia scylla etesia (Hewitson, 1867)
Eurema hecabe nivaria (Fruhstorfer, 1910)
Eurema blanda saraha (Fruhstorfer, 1912)
Eurema candida salomonis (Butler, 1898)
Eurema candida yatai  Tennent, 2004
Eurema candida woodfordi (Butler, 1898)

Pierinae
Elodina argypheus  Grose Smith, 1890
Elodina umbratica  Grose Smith, 1889
Saletara cycinna corinna (Wallace, 1867)
Appias ada florentia  Grose Smith, 1896
Cepora perimale agnata (Grose Smith, 1889)
Cepora perimale discolor (Mathew, 1887)
Cepora perimale radiata  Howarth, 1962
Belenois java peristhene (Boisduval, 1859)
Delias alberti alberti  Rothschild, 1904
Delias alberti tetamba  Arora, 1983
Delias schoenbergi choiseuli  Rothschild, 1904
Delias schoenbergi isabellae  Rothschild & Jordan, 1901
Delias lytaea georgiana  Grose Smith, 1895
Delias messalina orientalis  Arora, 1983

Lycaenidae

Curetinae
Curetis barsine solita (Butler, 1882)

Miletinae
Liphyra brassolis bougainvilleanus  Samson & Smart, 1980
Liphyra brassolis salomonis  Samson & Smart, 1980

Theclinae
Hypochrysops architas architas  Druce, 1891
Hypochrysops architas marie  Tennent, 2001
Hypochrysops architas cratevas (Druce, 1891)
Hypochrysops architas seuthes (Druce, 1891)
Hypochrysops scintillans constancea  D'Abrera, 1971
Hypochrysops scintillans jamesi  Tennent, 2001
Hypochrysops taeniata  Jordan, 1908
Hypochrysops julie  Tennent, 2001
Hypochrysops alyattes alyattes  Druce, 1891
Arhopala eurisus eurisus  Druce, 1891
Arhopala eurisus tovesi  Tennent, 1999
Arhopala florinda ( Grose-Smith, 1896) 
Arhopala mimsyi  Tennent, 1999
Arhopala tindali (Ribbe, 1899)
Arhopala sophrosyne (Grose Smith, 1889)
Arhopala thamyras phryxus (Boisduval, 1832)
Amblypodia annetta faisina (Ribbe, 1899)
Amblypodia annetta russellensis  Tennent, 2000
Hypolycaena alcestis (Grose Smith, 1889)
Deudorix woodfordi woodfordi  Druce, 1891
Deudorix confusa  Tennent, 2000
Deudorix viridens  Druce, 1891
Deudorix brilligi  Tennent, 2000
Deudorix diovis  Hewitson, 1863
Deudorix mathewi mathewi  Druce, 1892
Deudorix eagon  Tennent, 2000
Deudorix wabens  Tennent, 2000
Bindahara phocides chromis (Mathew, 1887)

Polyommatinae
Anthene paraffinis paraffinis (Fruhstorfer, 1916)
Anthene paraffinis nereia  Tite, 1966
Anthene paraffinis cristobalus  Tennent, 2001
Petrelaea tombugensis (Röber, 1886)
Nacaduba pactolus bilikii  Tennent, 2000
Nacaduba pactolus georgia  Tennent, 2000
Nacaduba berenice korene (Druce, 1891)
Nacaduba novaehebridensis guizoensis  Tite, 1963
Nacaduba novaehebridensis medius  Tennent, 2000
Nacaduba novaehebridensis novaehebridensis  Druce, 1892
Nacaduba dyopa lepidus (Tennent, 2000)
Nacaduba kurava euretes (Druce, 1891)
Nacaduba kurava cruzens  Tennent, 2000
Nacaduba factio  Tennent, 2000
Nacaduba cyanea chromia (Druce, 1891)
Nacaduba mallicollo markira  Tite, 1963
Nacaduba samsoni  Tennent, 2001
Tartesa astarte astarte (Butler, 1882)
Tartesa astarte plumbata (Druce, 1891)
Tartesa astarte narovona (Grose Smith, 1898)
Tartesa ugiensis (Druce, 1891)
Solomona sutakiki sutakiki  Tennent, 2000
Solomona sutakiki malaitae  Tennent, 2000
Erysichton lineata vincula (Druce, 1891)
Erysichton lineata imperialis  Tennent, 2000
Erysichton lineata biskira  Tennent, 2000
Erysichton palmyra lateplaga  Tite, 1963
Erysichton palmyra hauta  Tennent, 2000
Psychonotis kruera (Druce, 1891)
Psychonotis slithyi slithyi  Tennent, 1999
Psychonotis slithyi borogrovesi  Tennent, 1999
Psychonotis waihuru  Tennent, 1999
Psychonotis eleanor  Tennent, 1999
Psychonotis julie  Tennent, 1999
Prosotas nora caliginosa (Druce, 1891)
Prosotas russelli  Tennent, 2003
Prosotas talesia  Tite, 1963
Prosotas dubiosa eborata  Tite, 1963
Prosotas dubiosa livida  Tennent, 2000
Nothodanis schaeffera cepheis (Druce, 1891)
Catopyrops ancyra amaura (Druce, 1891)
Catopyrops ancyra ligamenta (Druce, 1891)
Catopyrops ancyra maniana (Druce, 1891)
Catopyrops keiria keiria (Druce, 1891)
Catopyrops keiria reducta  Howarth, 1962
Catopyrops keiria makira  Tennent, 2000
Catopyrops nebulosa nebulosa (Druce, 1892)
Ionolyce helicon caracalla (Waterhouse & Lyell, 1914)
Ionolyce lachlani  Tennent, 2001
Ionolyce brunnescens brunnescens  Tite, 1963
Ionolyce brunnescens cristobalus  Tennent, 2000
Ionolyce selkon  Parsons, 1986
Jamides soemias soemias  Druce, 1891
Jamides cephion  Druce, 1891
Jamides amarauge amarauge  Druce, 1891
Jamides amarauge hepworthi  Tennent, 2001
Jamides goodenovii (Butler, 1876)
Jamides morphoides  Butler, 1884
Jamides areas (Druce, 1891)
Jamides celeno sundara (Fruhstorfer, 1915)
Jamides celeno evanescens (Butler, 1875)
Jamides aetherialis caerulina (Mathew, 1887)
Epimastidia arienis arienis  Druce, 1891
Epimastidia arienis taisia  Tennent, 2001
Epimastidia arienis outgrabe  Tennent, 2001
Catochrysops strabo celebensis  Tite, 1959
Catochrysops amasea amasea  Waterhouse & Lyell, 1914
Catochrysops amasea reducta  Howarth, 1962
Catochrysops panormus pura  Tite, 1959
Catochrysops panormus rennellensis  Howarth, 1962
Catochrysops taitensis taitensis (Boisduval, 1832)
Catochrysops nubila  Tite, 1959
Lampides boeticus (Linnaeus, 1767)
Famegana alsulus alsulus (Herrich-Schaeffer, 1869)
Pithecops dionisius dionisius (Boisduval, 1832)
Pithecops steirema  Druce, 1890
Leptotes plinius pseudocassius (Murray, 1873)
Zizina labradus lampra (Tite, 1969)
Zizula hylax dampierensis (Rothschild, 1915)
Everes lacturnus palliensis (Ribbe, 1899)
Megisba strongyle monacha (Grose Smith, 1894)
Udara cardia cardia (C Felder, 1860)
Euchrysops cnejus cnidus  Waterhouse and Lyell, 1914
Luthrodes cleotas gades (Fruhstorfer, 1915)

Nymphalidae

Libytheinae
Libythea geoffroy orientalis (Godman & Salvin, 1888)
Libythea geoffroy howarthi  Peterson, 1968
Libythea geoffroy eborinus  Samson, 1980

Danainae
Tellervo hiero hiero (Godman & Salvin, 1888)
Tellervo hiero evages (Godman & Salvin, 1888)
Parantica schenkii schenkii (Koch, 1865)
Parantica garamantis garamantis (Godman & Salvin, 1888)
Ideopsis juventa sobrinoides (Butler, 1882)
Tirumala euploeomorpha (Howarth, Kawazoé & Sibatani, 1976)
Tirumala hamata obscurata (Butler, 1874)
Tirumala hamata insignis (Talbot, 1943)
Tirumala hamata richardi  Tennent, 2001
Tirumala hamata moderata (Butler, 1875)
Danaus affinis decipiens (Butler, 1882)
Danaus affinis monoensis  Tennent, 2001
Danaus affinis albonotata (Howarth, 1962)
Danaus affinis cometho (Godman & Salvin, 1888)
Danaus affinis insolata (Butler, 1870)
Danaus affinis ulawaensis  Tennent, 2001
Danaus affinis mendana  Tennent, 2001
Danaus petilia (Stoll, 1790)
Danaus plexippus plexippus (Linnaeus, 1758)
Tiradelphe schneideri  Ackery & Vane-Wright, 1984
Euploea sylvester melander (Grose Smith, 1897)
Euploea phaenareta heurippa (Godman & Salvin, 1888)
Euploea leucostictos polymela (Godman & Salvin, 1888)
Euploea leucostictos imitata (Butler, 1870)
Euploea leucostictos bellona (Howarth, 1962)
Euploea leucostictos rossi (Carpenter, 1953)
Euploea leucostictos crucis (Carpenter, 1953)
Euploea leucostictos iphianassa (Butler, 1866)
Euploea leucostictos eustachiella (Carpenter, 1953)
Euploea asyllus asyllus  Godman & Salvin, 1888
Euploea asyllus gerion (Godman & Salvin, 1888)
Euploea tulliolus mangolinella (Strand, 1914)
Euploea tulliolus pyres (Godman & Salvin, 1888)
Euploea boisduvalii fraudulenta (Butler, 1882)
Euploea boisduvalii addenda (Howarth, 1962)
Euploea boisduvalii pyrgion (Godman & Salvin, 1888)
Euploea boisduvalii brenchleyi (Butler, 1870)
Euploea boisduvalii lapeyrousei  Boisduval, 1832
Euploea algea rennellensis (Carpenter, 1953)
Euploea lewinii lilybaea (Fruhstorfer, 1911)
Euploea treitschkei aenea (Butler, 1882)
Euploea treitschkei lorenzo (Butler, 1870)
Euploea treitschkei jessica (Butler, 1869)
Euploea batesii honesta (Butler, 1882)
Euploea batesii kunggana  Carpenter, 1953
Euploea batesii woodfordi (Godman & Salvin, 1888)
Euploea batesii ackeryi  Tennent, 2001
Euploea batesii leucacron  Carpenter, 1953
Euploea nechos nechos  Mathew, 1887
Euploea nechos pronax (Godman & Salvin, 1888)
Euploea nechos prusias (Godman & Salvin, 1888)

Nymphalidae

Morphinae
Taenaris phorcas phorcas (Westwood, 1856)

Satyrinae
Mycalesis perseus lalassis (Hewitson, 1864)
Mycalesis splendens splendens  Mathew, 1887
Mycalesis splendens versicolor  Tennent, 2002
Mycalesis splendens guadalcanalensis  Tennent, 2002
Mycalesis splendens malaitensis  Uémura, 2000
Mycalesis splendens tenebrosus  Tennent, 2002
Mycalesis splendens magnificans  Tennent, 2002
Mycalesis interrupta interrupta  Grose Smith, 1889
Mycalesis interrupta woodsi  Tennent, 2002
Mycalesis biliki  Tennent, 2002
Mycalesis richardi  Tennent, 2002
Mycalesis sara  Mathew, 1887
Orsotriaena medus licium  Fruhstorfer, 1908
Melanitis leda salomonis  Fruhstorfer, 1908
Melanitis leda solandra (Fabricius, 1775)
Melanitis amabilis amabilis (Boisduval, 1832)
Melanitis constantia despoliata  Fruhstorfer, 1908
Argyronympha pulchra  Mathew, 1886
Argyronympha rubianensis rubianensis  Grose Smith, 1889
Argyronympha rubianensis vella (Fruhstorfer, 1911)
Argyronympha gracilipes  Jordan, 1924
Argyronympha danker  Tennent, 2001
Argyronympha ulava  Grose Smith, 1889
Argyronympha ugiensis  Mathew, 1886
Polyura epigenes monochromus (Niepelt, 1914)
Polyura epigenes epigenes (Godman & Salvin, 1888)
Polyura bicolor (Turlin & Sato, 1995)
Polyura jupiter attila (Grose Smith, 1889)
Prothoe ribbei  Rothschild, 1895

Apaturinae
Cyrestis acilia nitida (Mathew, 1887)
Cyrestis acilia russellensis  Tennent, 2001
Cyrestis acilia solomonis (Mathew, 1887)
Cyrestis acilia ulawana (Martin, 1903)
Cyrestis telamon bougainvillei (Ribbe, 1898)

Limenitidinae
Parthenos sylvia thesaurus (Mathew, 1887)
Parthenos sylvia ugiensis  Fruhstorfer, 1913
Parthenos sylvia thesaurinus  Grose Smith, 1897
Phaedyma fissizonata olega  Tennent, 2001
Phaedyma fissizonata vella  Eliot, 1969
Phaedyma fissizonata fissizonata (Butler, 1882)
Phaedyma fissizonata philipi  Tennent, 2001
Phaedyma viridens (Eliot, 1969)

Nymphalinae
Mynes woodfordi woodfordi  Godman & Salvin, 1888
Mynes woodfordi isabella  Fruhstorfer, 1906
Mynes woodfordi hercyna (Godman & Salvin, 1888)
Mynes woodfordi shannoni  Tennent, 2001
Doleschallia tongana menexema (Fruhstorfer, 1912)
Doleschallia tongana rennellensis (Howarth, 1962)
Doleschallia browni sciron (Godman & Salvin, 1888)
Doleschallia browni herrichii (Butler 1875)
Doleschallia rickardi  Grose Smith, 1890
Hypolimnas antilope shortlandica (Ribbe, 1898)
Hypolimnas exiguus  Samson, 1980
Hypolimnas pithoeka pithoeka  Kirsch, 1877
Hypolimnas pithoeka scopas (Godman & Salvin, 1888)
Hypolimnas pithoeka bradleyi  Howarth, 1962
Hypolimnas pithoeka ferruginea  Howarth, 1962
Hypolimnas pithoeka leveri  Tennent, 2001
Hypolimnas alimena diphridas  Fruhstorfer, 1912
Hypolimnas alimena diffusa  Howarth, 1962
Hypolimnas alimena libateia  Howarth, 1962
Hypolimnas alimena fuliginescens (Mathew, 1887)
Hypolimnas alimena catalai  Viette, 1950
Hypolimnas bolina nerina (Fabricius, 1775)
Hypolimnas misippus (Linnaeus, 1764)
Yoma algina pavonia (Mathew, 1887)
Junonia villida villida (Fabricius, 1787)
Junonia hedonia zelima (Fabricius, 1775)

Heliconiinae
Vindula arsinoe sapor (Godman & Salvin, 1888)
Vindula arsinoe albosignata (Talbot, 1932)
Vindula arsinoe intermedia  Tennent, 2001
Vindula arsinoe catenes (Godman & Salvin, 1888)
Vindula arsinoe clodia (Godman & Salvin, 1888)
Vagrans egista shortlandica (Fruhstorfer, 1912)
Vagrans egista propinqua (Miskin, 1884)
Vagrans egista hebridina (Waterhouse, 1920)
Phalanta alcippe ephyra (Godman & Salvin, 1888)
Phalanta alcippe bellona  Howarth, 1962
Phalanta alcippe rennellensis  Howarth, 1962
Cupha melichrysos tredecia (Mathew, 1887)
Cupha melichrysos melichrysos (Mathew, 1887)
Cupha aureus  Samson, 1980
Algiachroa woodfordi woodfordi (Godman & Salvin, 1888)
Algiachroa woodfordi malaitae  Tennent, 2001

Acraeinae
Acraea moluccana fumigata (Honrath, 1886)

References
W.John Tennent: A checklist of the butterflies of Melanesia, Micronesia, Polynesia and some adjacent areas. Zootaxa 1178: 1-209 (21 Apr. 2006)
 papers by W. John Tennent

Butterflies
Solomon Islands
Solomon Islands
Solomon Islands